The Louisville Coal Miners were a minor league baseball team based in Louisville, Colorado. In 1898, the Coal Miners briefly played as members of the Colorado State League, hosting home games at the Athletic Grounds. Louisville folded during the 1898 season.

History
Minor league baseball began in Louisville, Colorado, when the 1898 Louisville Coal Miners became members of the six–team Independent level Colorado State League.

The use of the "Coal Miners" moniker by Louisville was in reference to local industry. Coal mining in Louisville, Colorado was the prominent industry in the era, as the Welch Mine was the first in Louisville and opened in 1877, followed by the Acme Mine in 1888 and Caledonia Mine in 1890.

In 1898, the Louisville Coal Miners placed 2nd in the Colorado State League standings behind the Aspen Miners, who won the championship in the final season of the league. Six teams played in the 1898 league, led by Aspen with a 35–21 record. Louisville placed 2nd with a 10–11 record under manager Thomas Hinton. The Denver Grizzlies, Fort Collins Farmers, Leadville Blues and Pueblo Rovers rounded out the 1898 league members. The Louisville Coal Miners franchise disbanded on July 7, 1898, Aspen disbanded on July 27, 1898 and the Colorado State League permanently folded following the 1898 season.

Louisville player Ralph Glaze played numerous seasons of minor league baseball under the assumed name of "Ralph Pearce" to protect his college football and baseball eligibility.

Louisville, Colorado has not hosted another minor league team.

The ballpark
The Louisville Coal Miners played home minor league games at the Athletic Grounds. In the era, the ballpark was on Lee Avenue, located just a few hundred feet from the operational Caledonia Mine. The ballpark is still in use today on the same plot of land and is called Miners Field. The address is 1212 South Street, Louisville, Colorado.

Year–by–year record

Notable alumni

Ralph Glaze (1898)

See also
Louisville Coal Miners players

References

External links
 Louisville - Baseball Reference

Professional baseball teams in Colorado
Defunct baseball teams in Colorado
Baseball teams established in 1898
Baseball teams disestablished in 1898
Boulder County, Colorado
Colorado State League teams